Jean Christian Njoh N'Kongue (born 7 March 1983, in Obala) is a Cameroonian retired footballer who played as a striker.

Career
He signed for Oțelul Galați in June 2009, and after a few opportunities during the first half of the season that failed to impress the manager, he was loaned out at FCM Târgu Mureş. He returned to Oţelul in late May 2010, but agreed for a mutual departure in June 2010.

Notes

External links
 
 

1983 births
Living people
Cameroonian footballers
Association football forwards
Liga I players
ASC Oțelul Galați players
Liga II players
FC Delta Dobrogea Tulcea players
ASA 2013 Târgu Mureș players
SCM Râmnicu Vâlcea players
Cameroonian expatriate footballers
Cameroonian expatriate sportspeople in Romania
Expatriate footballers in Romania